"I Want You Bad (And That Ain't Good)" is a song written by Jackson Leap, and recorded by American country music singer Collin Raye.  The song reached the Top Ten on the Billboard Hot Country Singles & Tracks chart.  It was released in November 1992 as the second single from his CD In This Life.

Chart performance
The song debuted at number 64 on the Hot Country Singles & Tracks chart dated December 5, 1992. It charted for 20 weeks on that chart, and peaked at number 7 on the country chart dated March 13, 1993.

Charts

Year-end charts

References

1992 singles
Collin Raye songs
Song recordings produced by Garth Fundis
Epic Records singles
Music videos directed by Sherman Halsey
1992 songs